The Passaic County Vocational School District  is a comprehensive vocational public school district based in Wayne serving the vocational and training needs of high school students in ninth through twelfth grades and adults from Passaic County, New Jersey, United States. It consists of two sister schools, Passaic County Technical Institute and the Diana C. Lobosco STEM Academy.

As of the 2018–19 school year, the district, comprising one school, had an enrollment of 3,730 students and 330.0 classroom teachers (on an FTE basis), for a student–teacher ratio of 11.3:1.

School
Passaic County Technical Institute (PCTI) is a four-year countywide vocational public high school.

Diana C. Lobosco STEM Academy is a four-year countywide vocational public high school focusing on Biomedical Life Sciences, Engineering, and Computer Science.

Both schools are located on a campus in Wayne.

Administration
Core members of the district's administration are:
Diana Lobosco, Superintendent
Richard Giglio, Business Administrator / Board Secretary

References

External links
Official Web Site
 
School Data for the Passaic County Technical Institute, National Center for Education Statistics

School districts in Passaic County, New Jersey
Vocational school districts in New Jersey
Wayne, New Jersey